Jason Paul "J" Brown (born 13 June 1976) is an English singer and rapper. He is best known as a former member and lead singer of boy band Five. He was the oldest member of the band, which also included Sean Conlon, Ritchie Neville, Abz Love and Scott Robinson. In 2012, it was announced that Five, along with 911, Atomic Kitten, B*Witched, Honeyz and Liberty X, would be reuniting for the ITV2 reality series The Big Reunion, and although Brown initially agreed to take part in the reunion, he later backed out, claiming that he no longer wants to be in the public eye.

Early life and Five
Brown was born at the Cambridge Military Hospital at Aldershot, and as his father was in the military he lived in Germany, Canada and all over the north of England as a child. He spent his teenage and young adult life in Warrington and Newton-le-Willows before joining Five. Five were internationally successful, selling more than 20 million records over a period of five years.

Attempted comeback and I'm a Celebrity...Get Me Out of Here!
After Five disbanded in late 2001, Brown kept a low profile, although he was involved in several protests in the London area, notably against UK involvement in the wars in the Middle East. In 2006 he joined up with three of his former bandmates, Robinson, Neville and Love (fifth member Conlon was committed to a Sony contract and decided not to join them) for a planned relaunch of the band. However, not enough record company interest was generated, and Five's comeback was abandoned less than nine months later.

Soon after Five's relaunch plan was abandoned, Brown became a contestant on the seventh series of ITV's I'm a Celebrity...Get Me Out of Here!. He made it into the final along with Christopher Biggins and Janice Dickinson, and finished in third place. He also appeared as a part of Ant McPartlin's team on Ant & Dec's Saturday Night Takeaway (February – March 2008). Soon after he appeared on Fiver's Generation Sex, and later became involved in writing/producing for other musicians.

Second Five comeback
After Brown's ex-bandmate Conlon appeared on The Voice UK on 24 March 2012 and failed to make it past the audition stage, discussions were had between the former bandmates about the possibility of a second reunion. Five later announced that they would be reforming for the ITV2 series The Big Reunion, but at the last minute, Brown pulled out of the reunion and refused to be part of the show, claiming that he no longer wants to be in the public eye.

The Big Reunion: On Tour, an additional mini-series featuring the bands as they embarked on their arena tour, began airing on ITV2 on 5 September 2013. Brown refused to appear in the first series of The Big Reunion and only popped up in the second for a right-to-reply interview, where, aside from speaking about his shock and confusion at the anger aimed towards him, he also revealed a suicide attempt. He acknowledged his behaviour could have been seen as loud and overbearing, but he denied bullying Conlon. During a meeting with former bandmate Abz Love, Brown explained he that has moved on and does not feel comfortable returning to Five.

Personal life
Brown was previously in an on-off relationship with Spice Girls singer Melanie C.

References

External links
J Brown on I'm a Celebrity...Get Me Out of Here!

1976 births
Living people
Musicians from Aldershot
Five (band) members
English male singers
English male rappers
English people of Welsh descent
English expatriates in Germany
English expatriates in Canada
I'm a Celebrity...Get Me Out of Here! (British TV series) participants